Boris Dmitriyevich Grishin (born 4 January 1938 in Moscow) is a Russian water polo player who competed for the Soviet Union in the 1964 and the 1968 Summer Olympics. He is married to champion Olympic fencer Valentina Rastvorova. His daughter, Yelena Grishina, is also an Olympic fencer. Sergey Bida, Yelena's son and Boris's grandson, is a world champion fencer. Later he was a water polo coach. His son Yevgeny was also a successful water polo player.

See also
 List of Olympic medalists in water polo (men)

References

External links
 

1938 births
Living people
Soviet male water polo players
Russian male water polo players
Russian water polo coaches
Olympic water polo players of the Soviet Union
Water polo players at the 1964 Summer Olympics
Water polo players at the 1968 Summer Olympics
Olympic silver medalists for the Soviet Union
Olympic bronze medalists for the Soviet Union
Olympic medalists in water polo
Sportspeople from Moscow
Medalists at the 1968 Summer Olympics
Medalists at the 1964 Summer Olympics